The China women's national 3x3 team is a national 3x3 basketball team of China, governed by the Basketball Association of the People's Republic of China. It represents the country in international 3x3 (3 against 3) women's basketball competitions.

Tournament record

Summer Olympics

World Cup

2020 Olympic roster

See also
China men's national 3x3 team
China women's national basketball team

References

External links

3
Women's national 3x3 basketball teams